Mountain Park is the name of two places in the U.S. state of Georgia:

Mountain Park, Fulton County, Georgia, an incorporated city
Mountain Park, Gwinnett County, Georgia, an unincorporated community

nl:Mountain Park (Georgia)